Route 401 is a  state highway in East Greenwich, Rhode Island, United States.

Route description
Route 401 begins at an intersection with Route 2 (County Trail) / Division Street in East Greenwich, and begins east along a four-lane suburban road. It meets Route 4 (Col. Rodman Highway) just east at a partial cloverleaf interchange, which is exit 8 on Route 4. Route 401 continues east and crosses the Maskerchugg River, then curves southeast and crosses Dark Entry Brook. It then reaches its eastern terminus at US 1 (Main Street) / Rocky Hollow Road just west of Greenwich Cove.

Major intersections

See also

 List of state highways in Rhode Island

References

External links

 2019 Highway Map, Rhode Island

401
Transportation in Kent County, Rhode Island